Ariane may refer to:

Ariana (name), also Ariane, Arianne

Arts
 Ariane (Martinů), an opera by Bohuslav Martinů, first performed 1961
 Ariane (Massenet), an opera by Jules Massenet, first performed 1906
 Ariane (film), a 1931 German film directed by Paul Czinner
 Ariane Films, a former French film production company
 Ariane, a play by Thomas Corneille (1625–1709)
 Ariane, the name of the 1957 film Love in the Afternoon in French speaking markets

Transportation
 Simca Ariane, a French car by Simca, 1957–1963
 Ariane (automobile), a French car by Automobiles Ariane, 1907
 French ship Ariane, the name of several French ships
 Ariane (rocket family), European rockets operated by Arianespace

Other uses
 Ariane (apple), an apple cultivar
 1225 Ariane, an asteroid
 Ariane, a brand name of the antiandrogen rezvilutamide
 Tour Ariane (Ariane Tower), an office building west of Paris

See also
Ariadna (disambiguation)
Ariadne (disambiguation)
Arianna (disambiguation)
Ariana (disambiguation)
Ariano (disambiguation)